Depressaria cinderella is a moth of the family Depressariidae which is endemic to Portugal.

The larvae feed on Conopodium capillifolium.

References

External links
Lepiforum.de

Moths described in 2002
Depressaria
Endemic arthropods of Portugal
Moths of Europe